The 2012–13 season was Sevilla Football Club's 12th consecutive season in La Liga and its first season without participating in European competitions since 2004. The team manager in the previous season, Míchel, continued with the team.

Transfers

In

Out

Loans out

Loan returns

Promotion from youth system

Winter transfers

In

Out

Loan in

Loan out

Promotion from youth system

Players

Squad information

Youth system

Long-term injuries

Congenital abnormality in Maduro's heart 
Out between: July 2012 – September 2012
On 28 July, Sevilla announced that Hedwiges Maduro was suffering from a congenital anomaly in his heart. It was detected in a special examination by physicians during the second part of the team's summer concentration in Costa Ballena, near Rota. The club said days after that the player had traveled to Houston, Texas, for an examination and a full diagnosis. Maduro said after the first extensive revisions made in Spain that his life was not in danger. After being investigated in Houston by Dr. Paolo Angelini, Sevilla medical services made public that Maduro's abnormality would not prevent him from playing football professionally, and he could rejoin the squad as normal, in late August.

Trochowski's knee injury 
Out between: September 2012 – May 2013
After scoring the first goal of the match against Barcelona on 29 September, Piotr Trochowski had to leave the match with a knee injury. Sevilla's medical services analyzed his illness during the following days. The treatment he received first failed, and doctors thought it was appropriate to operate him in late October in Denver, Colorado. After the surgery, the club told press that the time without playing would be eight months, figuring that his reappearance could be in May 2013, meaning he would miss the remainder of the season.

Called up by their national football team

Match statistics
Updated to 29 January 2013

Competitions

Pre-season and friendly tournaments

Friendly matches

2nd Antonio Camacho Memorial

36th Costa Brava Trophy

5th Antonio Puerta Trophy

La Liga

League table

Results summary

Results by round

Matches

Copa del Rey

Round of 32

Round of 16

Quarter-finals

Semi-finals

References

Sevilla FC seasons
Sevilla